Dead Before Dying is a novel written by South African novelist Deon Meyer. It was first published as Feniks in Afrikaans in 1996 before being translated by Madeleine van Biljon in 1999. The novel has been adapted into a series known as  Cape Town.

References 

1996 novels
Detective novels
Novels about murder
20th-century South African novels